The All American Stakes is a Listed American Thoroughbred race for horses three-years-old and older over a distance of one mile on the turf at Golden Gate Fields, Berkeley, California. It currently offers a purse of $100,000.

History

The event was inaugurated in 1968 on dirt at a distance of six furlongs as the All American Handicap.  After the racetrack installed a turf course in 1972 the event was moved to the grass over a distance of 5 furlongs and stayed that way until 1978.  In 1997 the event revert to the dirt.

The event was held at the defunct Bay Meadows Racetrack between 2001 and 2005 and was renamed during that period as the Seabiscuit Handicap and Seabiscuit Breeders' Cup Handicap.

In 2006 the race was returned to Golden Gate Fields and in 2007 the synthetic All Weather track called Tapeta was installed at the track.

The event had several distance changes during the years.

In 2020 the event was downgraded to Listed.

Records

Speed record:
 1:36.14- G G Ryder (2015)

Most wins:
 2 - G G Ryder           (2015, 2017) 
 2 - Summer Hit          (2013, 2014)
 2 - Yougottawanna       (2004, 2005)

Most wins by a jockey:
 7 - Russell Baze        (1981, 1982, 1998, 1999, 2004, 2013, 2014)

Most wins by a trainer:
 9 - Jerry Hollendorfer  (1999, 2004, 2005, 2011, 2013, 2014, 2015, 2017, 2019)

Most wins by an owner:
 5 - Jerry Hollendorfer (2011, 2013, 2014, 2015, 2017)

Winners since 1973

Legend:

 
Notes:

¶ Filly/Mare

† Held at Bay Meadows Race Track

Earlier known winners 

 1972 - Long Position
 1971 - Dizzy Babe
 1970 - Royal Fols
 1969 - Royal Fols
 1968 - Lucky PJ

References

External links
 Golden Gate Fields website

Graded stakes races in the United States
Horse races in California
Sports in the San Francisco Bay Area
Golden Gate Fields
1968 establishments in California
Recurring sporting events established in 1968